The following highways are numbered 478:

Australia 

  Back Beach Road

Canada
Manitoba Provincial Road 478

Japan
 Japan National Route 478

United States
  Interstate 478 (unsigned designation for the Brooklyn–Battery Tunnel)
  County Road 478 (Sumter County, Florida)
  County Road 478A (Sumter County, Florida)
  Louisiana Highway 478
  Maryland Route 478
  New Mexico State Road 478
  Pennsylvania Route 478
  Puerto Rico Highway 478
  Farm to Market Road 478 (Texas)
  Texas State Highway Loop 478